Olivia Francisca Buckley née Dussek (1799–1847) was an English harpist, organist and composer. She was born in London, the daughter of Czech composer Jan Ladislav Dussek and Scottish composer Sophia Corri. Dussek left his wife, and Olivia was taught harp and piano by her mother, making her debut at the age of eight at the Argyle Rooms. She married Richard William Buckley and had ten children.

Buckley taught music, and around 1840 became organist at Kensington parish church. She used the pen name O. B. Dussek for the publication of her music.

Works
Buckley composed for harp and vocal works. Selected compositions include:
The third Royal Infant opera, composed for Their Royal Highnesses Prince Alfred & Princess Alice
The Harpist's Friend, collection
Fairy Songs and Ballads for the Young, collection

References

External links

1799 births
1847 deaths
19th-century British composers
19th-century classical composers
19th-century English musicians
19th-century organists
British music educators
English classical composers
English classical harpists
English classical organists
English Romantic composers
Women classical composers
Women music educators
Women organists
19th-century women composers